Akram Shah (born 11 June 1974 or 27 July 1978) is an Indian judoka, played in the extra-lightweight (-60 kg) in various National and International tournaments. He was awarded highest Indian Sportsperson Award - Arjuna Award in the year 2003.

He joined the department of Central Reserve Police Force (CRPF) of India on 27 October 1998 on the basis of sports and participated in All India Police Games in Judo event winning Gold medals in 2001 and 2007 and Silver medal in 2005 and 2006. He remained an undisputed hero in the field of National Judo discipline almost ten years from 2000 to 2009 winning medals in every year. He also participated in 2004 Athens Olympics and secured ninth place in Judo event.

Awards

References

External links 
 

1974 births
Living people
Indian male judoka
Indian male martial artists
Martial artists from Delhi
Olympic judoka of India
Judoka at the 2004 Summer Olympics
Asian Games competitors for India
Judoka at the 2002 Asian Games
Commonwealth Games medallists in judo
Commonwealth Games silver medallists for India
Judoka at the 2002 Commonwealth Games
South Asian Games gold medalists for India
South Asian Games medalists in judo
Recipients of the Arjuna Award
21st-century Indian people
Medallists at the 2002 Commonwealth Games